The 2003 Toulon Tournament was the 31st edition of the Toulon Tournament, and was held from 10 to 21 June 2003. It was won by Portugal, after they beat Italy in the final.

Results

Group A

Table

Match summaries

Group B

Table

Match summaries

Third place match

Final

Penghargaan 
After the final, the following players were rewarded for their performances during the competition.

Pemain Terbaik:  Javier Mascherano
Pemain Paling Elegan:  Raul Meireles
Pemain Paling Di Hormati:  Juan Carlos Medina
Penjaga Gawang Terbaik:  Bruno Vale
Pencetak Gol Terbanyak:  Germán Herrera,  Luís Lourenço,  Francesco Ruopolo (3 goals each)
Harga Spesial:  Francesco Ruopolo
Pemain Muda Terbaik:  Cristiano Ronaldo
Gol Terbaik Turnamen:  Hiroto Mogi

References 

2003
2002–03 in French football
2003 in youth association football
June 2003 sports events in France